Second Hand Life is the tenth solo studio album by Joe Lynn Turner. The album features songs written by artists like Jim Peterik and Martin Briley.

Track listing
 "Your Love Is Life" (Joe Lynn Turner, Tor Talle, Deanna Johnston) – 4:39
 "Got Me Where You Want Me" (Martin Briley) – 3:19 
 "Second Hand Life" (Turner, Jim Peterik) – 4:34 
 "In Your Eyes" (Turner, Karl Cochran, Jaime Kyle) – 4:55
 "Blood Red Sky" (Turner, Cochran, Bob Held) – 5:57 
 "Stroke of Midnight" (Ritchie Blackmore, Turner, Peterik, Roger Glover) – 4:48 
 "Over the Top" (Turner, Cochran, Steve Johnstad) – 4:25 
 "Cruel" (Turner) – 3:48 
 "Sweet Obsession" (Turner, Jack Ponti) – 3:45 
 "Love Is on Our Side" (Turner, Aleks de Carvalho) – 4:46 
 "Two Lights" (bonus track) (Turner, Aleks de Carvalho) - 5:04

The song "Stroke of Midnight" comes from an original version of "One Man's Meat" in The Battle Rages On... sessions with Deep Purple.

Friday Music released Second Hand Life - The Deluxe Edition on August 28, 2007.
 "Your Love Is Life" (Joe Lynn Turner, Tor Talle, Deanna Johnston) – 4:39
 "Got Me Where You Want Me" (Martin Briley) – 3:19 
 "Second Hand Life" (Turner, Jim Peterik) – 4:34 
 "In Your Eyes" (Turner, Karl Cochran, Jaime Kyle) – 4:55
 "Blood Red Sky" (Turner, Cochran, Bob Held) – 5:57 
 "Stroke of Midnight" (Ritchie Blackmore, Turner, Peterik, Roger Glover) – 4:48 
 "Off The Hook" (Turner, Cochran, Held) – 4:10  (Bonus Track)
 "Over the Top" (Turner, Cochran, Steve Johnstad) – 4:25 
 "Cruel" (Turner) – 3:48 
 "Sweet Obsession" (Turner, Jack Ponti) – 3:45 
 "Love Is on Our Side" (Turner, Aleks de Carvalho) – 4:46 
 "Two Lights" (Turner, Aleks de Carvalho) - 5:04 (Bonus Track)
 "Freedom's Wings" (Turner, Cross, Regan)'' – 4:41  (Bonus Track)

Personnel
Joe Lynn Turner: Vocals
Karl Cochran: Guitars, Bass on tracks 1,4,5,7,9,10,11
Bob Held - bass on tracks 2, 3, 6, and 8.
Michael Cartellone - drums
Gary Corbett - keyboards

Production
Executive Producer – Mark Wexler
Mixing – Gary Tole
Engineer – Gary Tole

References

External links
Joe Lynn Turner official website

2007 albums
Joe Lynn Turner albums
Frontiers Records albums